Bread Financial Holdings, Inc. is an American publicly traded provider of loyalty and marketing services, such as private label credit cards, coalition loyalty programs, and direct marketing, derived from the capture and analysis of transaction-rich data.

History

Alliance Data was formed from the December 1996 merger of two entities: J.C. Penney's credit card processing unit and The Limited's credit card bank operation, named World Financial Network National Bank.

In August 1998, Alliance Data acquired LoyaltyOne, then-branded The Loyalty Group Canada, for $250 million.  The deal gave Alliance Data two valuable business enhancements, Canada's Air Miles Rewards Program and the company behind the popular Air Miles program, LoyaltyOne.

In 2001, Alliance Data went public.

In May 2007, The Blackstone Group, a private equity firm, announced plans to acquire Alliance Data. In April 2008, Alliance Data terminated the merger agreement with Blackstone Affiliates.

Ed Heffernan was promoted to president and CEO of Alliance Data in February 2009, after being with the company since 1998.

On June 7, 2019, Ed Heffernan resigned as CEO of Alliance Data and was replaced by Melisa Miller, who previously ran Alliance Data's Card Services division. This change in leadership effectively moved Alliance Data's Headquarters from Plano, Texas, to Columbus, Ohio.

Melisa Miller held the role for roughly 6 months before being replaced by former CITI executive Ralph Andretta. In 2019, Alliance Data opened its first international office in Bangalore, India.

In November 2021, Alliance Data completed the separation of its LoyaltyOne segment, consisting of the Canadian AIR MILES Reward Program and Netherlands-based BrandLoyalty businesses, into an independent, publicly traded company, Loyalty Ventures Inc. In March 2022, Alliance Data rebranded as Bread Financial as part of an effort to streamline their business model into a tech-forward financial services company providing a wider range of financial options.

Former businesses

Alliance Data Card Services
Card Services is a provider of integrated credit and marketing services including private label, co-branded and commercial credit card programs. Alliance Data Card Services manages over 135 card programs for retail brands such as Victoria’s Secret, J.Crew, Eddie Bauer, Buckle, HSN, Pottery Barn, Pier 1 Imports, Lexus, Toyota, Williams Sonoma and Wayfair among many others.

In 2011, Alliance Data, in partnership with NICE Systems, was honored with the Operational Leadership Award for its customer care centers by Ventana Research.

Alliance Data Card Services maintains two banks to manage the funding and receivables for its clients' credit programs. In September 2012, the banks rebranded their names from WFNNB (World Financial Network [National] Bank) and WFCB (World Financial Capital Bank) to both operate under the Comenity name, as Comenity Bank and Comenity Capital Bank, respectively.

LoyaltyOne
LoyaltyOne, located in Canada, provides loyalty marketing programs for North American brands in the retail, financial services, grocery, petroleum, travel, and hospitality industries.

Five businesses make up the LoyaltyOne: Air Miles national reward program, in which approximately two-thirds of Canadian households participate; Colloquy; LoyaltyOne Consulting; Precima; and Squareknot.

Hewitt Associates named LoyaltyOne in their "2014 List of the 50 Best Employers in Canada."

Epsilon
Epsilon provides a broad range of loyalty marketing services spanning database marketing, direct mail, email marketing, web development, loyalty programs, analytics, data services, strategic consulting, and creative services, among others.

Ad Age has ranked Epsilon among the top marketing services firms and direct marketing agencies for several years, and Epsilon has the distinction as being the Top US Agency From All Disciplines and Top US CRM/Direct Marketing Agencies for 2012.
 It sends billions of permission-based emails every year. Acquired by Epsilon in 2011, Aspen Marketing Services is a marketing services agency headquartered in Chicago, Illinois, with locations in the United States and Canada. In 2012, Epsilon reached an agreement to acquire the Hyper Marketing ("HMI") group of companies, the largest privately held digital marketing services agencies in the United States, for about $460 million.

In March 2011, Epsilon detected unauthorized access to its email database, resulting in the theft of email addresses of its clients' customers.

In late February 2013, Facebook announced partnerships with four companies, including Epsilon, to help reshape its targeted advertising strategy.

Because of Epsilon's growth over the past several years, the company relocated its headquarters to the former Nokia regional headquarters space in Las Colinas, Texas, near Dallas.

In March 2014, 60 Minutes interviewed Bryan Kennedy, chairman and CEO of Epsilon, as part of its segment, "The Data Brokers: Selling Your Personal Information".

In April 2019, Publicis Groupe acquired Epsilon for $4.4 billion. This was the second biggest deal in the history of advertising, behind only Dentsu's $5 billion acquisition of Aegis Group in 2012.

Controversy

In 2010 Epsilon failed to heed warnings to secure data.  In March 2011 it was discovered that email addresses from customers of 50 client companies were stolen.  The company quickly notified the public about the breach.  In June 2011 company executives were called before Congress to answer questions about the security breach.

Products and Technology
In October 2020, Alliance Data launched Enhanced Digital Suite.

In October 2020, Alliance Data selected Fiserv for Credit Processing Services.

In 2021, Alliance Data invested $100M in digital technologies to expand consumer credit options beyond retail deals and cards.

In April 2022, Bread Financial partnered with American Express and launched the Bread Cashback American Express Credit Card.

Company acquisitions and divestitures
 1998: LoyaltyOne was acquired by Alliance Data.
 2002: Colloquy/Frequency Marketing was acquired by Alliance Data.
 2004: Epsilon was acquired by Alliance Data.
 2005: Bigfoot Interactive was acquired by Alliance Data.
 2006: Abacus was acquired by Alliance Data's Epsilon from DoubleClick.
 2008: Heartland Payment Systems acquired Alliance Data's Network Services business.
 2008: Vertex acquired Alliance Data’s Utility Services business.
 2011: Aspen Marketing Services was acquired by Alliance Data (to be a part of Epsilon).
 2012: Alliance Data acquired the $475 million private label credit card portfolio of The Bon-Ton Stores, Inc.
 2012: Epsilon acquires Hyper Marketing and agencies Ryan Partnership & Catapult.
 2014: AD acquired Conversant Formerly known as ValueClick; Conversant specialized in the affiliate marketing business, which revolved around video and mobile channels.
 2014: Alliance Data acquires BrandLoyalty.
 2014: Epsilon acquires Conversant, formerly ValueClick.
2019: Alliance Data sells off Epsilon to Publicis for $4.4B.
2019: Alliance Data acquired Lon Operations Inc., a digital payments company operating under the trademark Bread.
2020: Alliance Data closes Bread deal in December.

References

External links 

Marketing companies established in 1996
American companies established in 1996
Business models
Companies based in the Columbus, Ohio metropolitan area
Companies listed on the New York Stock Exchange
Customer loyalty programs
Data brokers
Data collection